Musketeers are a junior-level synchronized skating team representing the figure skating club Helsingin Luistelijat, based in Helsinki, Finland.

Helsingin Luistelijat also fields Marigold IceUnity at the senior level, Starlights at the novice level, Sunlights at the Juvenile level and Creme De Ments at the adult level.

Musketeers are the reigning World Junior Champions. In addition to the 2013 Championship, they have won the Junior World Junior Challenge Cup four times from 2006–2009, the silver medal two times and the bronze medal four times.

The team's motto is “One for all and all for one”.

Competitive results

Seasons 2000–10

Seasons 2010–15

References

Junior synchronized skating teams
Sports teams in Finland
Figure skating in Finland
Sports clubs in Helsinki
World Junior Synchronized Skating Championships medalists